Frank Hovland (born 6 June 1960 in Bergen, Norway) is a Norwegian rock musician and music producer, known from bands like Program 81/82 with his partner Kate Augestad, and cooperations with Ronni Le Tekrø, Terje Rypdal, Chris Thompson and Mads Eriksen.

Career
Hovland started early playing with different rock bands like Program 81/82, Avenue Talk, and Spastisk Ekstase in Bergen. Avenue Talk was the support act for A-ha on their Norway tour in 1987.

With Mads Eriksen he has been regular bassist and record producer later also with Chris Tompson. In 2007 he with Magnar Bernes and Mads Eriksen and released the record Mad & Hungry. In 2009 he toured with Ronni Le Tekrø, Terje Rypdal and Mads Eriksen (N3) "E.X.P"/"Group", he was backing band together with Gunnar Bjelland and Paolo Vinaccia.

Discography

With Program 81/82
1981: Program 81 (mini-LP)
1981: Try to reach ... (Norwegian Label A / S)
1982: Pictures (Norwegian Label A / S)
1983: Unleash (Pro-Gram O'Phone3)

With Avenue Talk
1988: Cry for Mercy (Slagerfabrikken)

With Stain Monsters
1991: Stain Monsters (Stageway Records)

With Mads Eriksen
1990: Journey (Storyteller Records)
1991: Storyteller – (Storyteller Records)
1993: Intermission Troldhaugen (Lightbringer, 1993)
1994: M.E. (Storyteller Records)
1997: The Plough Boy (Storyteller Records)
1998: Suburban Cowboy (MTG Music)
2001: Redhanded (Grappa Records)
2010: Just What the World Needs (MTG Music)

With Chris Thompson
2004: Rediscovery (VME), with
2008: Live (Voiceprint)
2009: Timeline (Voiceprint)
2011: Acoustic (2011), with Chris Thompson live & unplugged performance recorded at the WDR2 radio station 2006 in Cologne, Germany
2011: Berlin Live & The Aschffenburg Remains Live at the Colos-Saal (Gonzo Multimedia)

Tribute to Lasse Myrvold
2006: Dans Til Musikken (Reel Noise Records), with various artists

With Mad & Hungry
2007: Travelin (Hungry records)

References

External links 
Chris Thompson & Mads Eriksen Band – Hamburg Harley Days, 24.06.2011 on YouTube
Terje Rypdal Trio – Garina 2009 – pt 1/6 on YouTube

Norwegian rock bass guitarists
Norwegian male bass guitarists
Norwegian record producers
1960 births
Living people
Musicians from Bergen